Mawan was a railway station on the Pinghu–Nanshan railway in Nanshan District, Shenzhen. The station was closed in 2016.

References

Railway stations in Guangdong
Railway stations closed in 2016